The Katsina State Executive Council (also known as, the Cabinet of Katsina State) is the highest formal governmental body that plays important roles in the Government of Katsina State headed by the Governor of Katsina State. It consists of the Deputy Governor, Secretary to the State Government, Chief of Staff, and Commissioners who preside over ministerial departments.

Functions
The Executive Council exists to advise and direct the Governor. Their appointment as members of the Executive Council gives them the authority to execute power over their fields.

Current cabinet
The current Executive Council is serving under the Aminu Bello Masari administration.

References

Katsina
Politics of Katsina State